Hartmut Surmann (born 1963 in Dülmen,  West Germany) is a Roboticist, Professor for Autonomous Systems at Applied University of Gelsenkirchen and Researcher at the Fraunhofer Society's Institut Intelligente Analyse- und Informationssystem (IAIS).  His primary research interests are autonomous mobile robotics and
computational intelligence. He received several awards, e.g., the FUZZ-IEEE/IFES'95 robot intelligence award, NC2001 best presentation award,
SSRR 2005 best paper award and the Ph.D. award for his thesis from the German AI institutes in 1996.
His robot KURT3D won the second place in the RoboCup rescue robot league at the world championship in Lisbon in 2004. He leads the international
rescue robotic team during collapse of the historical archive of the city of cologne in March 2009.

Biography

Education
Surmann received his diploma in Computer Science and his PhD in Electrical Engineering from the
University of Dortmund, Germany, in 1989 and 1995, respectively.

External links
 Hartmut Surmann's IAIS homepage.
 Hartmut Surmann's homepage.

1963 births
Living people
German roboticists
German computer scientists
People from Coesfeld